The Centro Universitário Eurípides de Marília (UNIVEM)   is a university in the city of Marília in Brazil. It is governed by the Fundação de Ensino Eurípides Soares da Rocha and was founded in 1967.

External links
http://www.univem.edu.br 
http://www.univem.edu.br/espaco_cultural

Educational institutions established in 1967
Marília
1967 establishments in Brazil
Universities and colleges in São Paulo (state)
Private universities and colleges in Brazil